is a national highway in the Japanese prefectures of Hokkaido and Aomori. Route 338 stretches  from National Route 5 in Hakodate, Hokkaido south across the Tsugaru Strait by ferry to Ōma, Aomori, around the western, southern, and eastern edges of the Shimokita Peninsula and finally to Oirase.

Route description

Hakodate
The highway travels southwest along city streets through the city, then curves to the northwest, and turns northeast towards the former site of the city's ferry terminal, which was moved to the northwest of Hakodate Station. The highway's brief  route in Hokkaido ends at the former terminal, which has since been converted into a retail area. Aside from the last  of the highway near the ferry terminal, the highway also carries the Main Line of the Hakodate City Tram in its median.

Aomori Prefecture
The highway is next carried south across the Tsugaru Strait via the Tsugaru Kaikyō Ferry to Ōma on the northern tip of Aomori Prefecture's Shimokita Peninsula. From the route's northern terminus in Hakodate to Ōma, National Route 338 runs concurrent with National Route 279; however, in Ōma, National Route 279 leaves the concurrency, travelling southeast towards Mutsu while National Route 338 heads south towards the village of Sai. After passing through Sai, the highway enters the western edge of Mutsu and turns east towards the center of the city.

In Mutsu, national routes 279 and 338 briefly meet again, sharing a short concurrency. After leaving the concurrency, National Route 338 continues its path southeast across the peninsula while National Route 279 heads south towards Noheji at the southern base of the peninsula. National Route 338 parallels the Pacific coast for the rest of its route south through Higashidōri, Rokkasho, and Misawa before terminating in Oirase.

History
National Route 338 was established by the Cabinet of Japan in 1975 between Hakodate and Oirase which was then the town of Shimoda, in Aomori.

Major intersections

See also

References

External links

338
Roads in Aomori Prefecture
Roads in Hokkaido